is a passenger railway station in the city of Abiko, Chiba Prefecture Japan, operated by the East Japan Railway Company (JR East).

Lines
Higashi-Abiko Station is served by the Abiko Branch Line of the Narita Line, and is located 3.4 kilometers from the terminus of branch line at Abiko Station.

Station layout
Higashi-Abiko Station has two parallel side platforms connected by a level crossing. There is no station building, and the station is unattended.

Platforms

History
Higashi-Abiko Station was opened on October 12, 1950 as a station on the Japan National Railways (JNR). The station was absorbed into the JR East network upon the privatization of the JNR on April 1, 1987.

Passenger statistics
In fiscal 2006, the station was used by an average of 729 passengers daily.

Surrounding area
 
 Abiko Middle School
 Abiko Post Office

See also
 List of railway stations in Japan

References

External links

JR East station information 

Railway stations in Japan opened in 1950
Railway stations in Chiba Prefecture
Narita Line
Abiko, Chiba